Ritu may refer to:

Ritu (Indian season), the word for 'seasons' in various calendars of South Asia
Ṛtú or ritu, a fixed or appointed time in Vedic
Rutog County (Ritu County), a county in Tibet
Ritu (2009 film), a Malayalam film directed by Shyamaprasad
Ritu (2014 film), a Nepali film directed by Manoj Adhikari
Ritu, a 2013 album by Saille
Ritu Samhaaram, or Ṛtusaṃhāra, a Sanskrit epic describing the Indian seasons

Ritu as a given name  
Ritu Arya, British Indian actress
Ritu Chaudhry the birth name of actress Mahima Chaudhry
Ritu Beri, an Indian fashion designer
Ritu Kapoor-Nanda, an Indian insurance entrepreneur
Ritu Raj, a California entrepreneur, known for founding tech startups Avasta, OrchestratorMail and Objectiveli, as well as Wag Hotel
Ritu Rani, Indian field hockey player
Ritu Rani, Indian football player
Ritu Kumar, Indian fashion designer
Ritu Barmecha, Indian film actress 
Ritu Varma, Indian film actress
Ritu Shivpuri, Indian film actress and model
Ritu Pathak, Bollywood playback singer